John Garrett may refer to:

Politicians
John Garrett (Australian politician) (1805–1885), member of the New South Wales Legislative Assembly
John Garrett (British politician) (1931–2007), British management consultant and politician
John Sidney Garrett (1921–2005), Louisiana state representative
John W. Garrett (diplomat) (1872–1942), United States ambassador

Sports
John Garrett (American football) (born 1965), American football coach and former wide receiver
John Garrett (ice hockey) (born 1951), Canadian hockey player and sports commentator
John Garrett (rower) (born 1963), British Olympic rower

Others
John W. Garrett (1820–1884), American banker, philanthropist, and railroad executive
John Raymond Garrett (born 1940), Australian/British photographer
John Garrett (publisher) (active 2005–2021), publisher of a chain of hyperlocal newspapers in Texas
John Garrett (comics), fictional character from Marvel Comics and Agents of S.H.I.E.L.D. TV series from 1986 to present (2021)